Californium is a chemical element with symbol Cf and atomic number 98.

Californium may also refer to:

 Californium (video game), a 2016 video game
 "Californium", a song on the album Brownout by Headset

See also

 Cf (disambiguation)
 Isotopes of californium